Bhaya is a moribund and possibly extinct Indo-Aryan language spoken in the lower Sindh province. According to Ethnologue, it belongs to the Western Hindi subgroup, and possesses considerable lexical and morphemic similarities with neighbouring languages. An unwritten language, it has often been subject to erroneous, arbitrary, or politically motivated designation as a dialect.

References

Rajasthani languages
 
Languages of Sindh